My Dear Subject is a 1988 Swiss drama film directed by Anne-Marie Miéville. The film was selected as the Swiss entry for the Best Foreign Language Film at the 62nd Academy Awards, but was not accepted as a nominee.

Cast
 Gaële Le Roi as Angèle
 Anny Romand as Agnès
 Hélène Roussel as Odile
 Yves Neff as Carlo
 Bernard Woringer as François
 Hanns Zischler as Hans
 Marc Darnault as Auguste

See also
 List of submissions to the 62nd Academy Awards for Best Foreign Language Film
 List of Swiss submissions for the Academy Award for Best Foreign Language Film

References

External links
 

1989 films
1988 drama films
1988 films
Swiss drama films
1980s French-language films
1989 drama films
French-language Swiss films